The 2015 Asian Archery Championships were the 19th edition of the event, and were held in Bangkok, Thailand from 3 to 8 November 2015. This acted as a qualifying tournament for the 2016 Summer Olympics.

Medal summary

Recurve

Compound

Medal table

References

External links
 World Archery Link

2015 in archery
2015 in Thai sport
Asian Archery Championships
International archery competitions hosted by Thailand